Somabrachys capsitana is a moth in the family Somabrachyidae. It was described by Pierre Chrétien.

References

Zygaenoidea